Anglia Ruskin University (ARU) is a public university in East Anglia, United Kingdom. Its origins are in the Cambridge School of Art, founded by William John Beamont, a Fellow of Trinity College at University of Cambridge, in 1858. It became a university in 1992, and was renamed after Oxford University Professor, Author John Ruskin in 2005. It is one of the "post-1992 universities". The motto of the university is in Latin Excellentia per societatem, in English Excellence through partnership.

Anglia Ruskin has 39,400 students worldwide with campuses in Cambridge, Chelmsford, Peterborough, and London.

There are four faculties of study at the university: Faculty of Business and Law, Faculty of Arts, Humanities & Social Sciences, Faculty of Health, Education, Medicine & Social Care, and Faculty of Science & Engineering.

Campuses
The university has campuses in Cambridge, Chelmsford, Peterborough, and London.

Facilities

Cambridge 
Anglia Ruskin's Cambridge Campus is home to one of only 9 optometry schools in the UK, having its own optometry clinic.

The Cambridge campus has recently been redeveloped, which began with the refurbishment of Helmore, the main building on East Road, completed in 2006. In 2009, one of the university's largest buildings, Rackham, in the centre of the campus, was demolished to make way for the new Lord Ashcroft International Business School. The new business school was opened in 2011. The Mumford Theatre, which presents a range of professional touring, local community and student theatre for both the public and members of the university, is housed at the centre of the campus. From 2015, a new building at Young Street hosted the health courses, like nursing, midwifery, paramedic, ODP etc.

Chelmsford 
The Chelmsford campus houses the Queen's Building (opened in 1995) and the Sawyer's Building (opened in 2001). The Queen's Building was inaugurated by Queen Elizabeth II. The Michael A Ashcroft Building opened in 2003 (renamed the Lord Ashcroft Building) by Prince Edward, Earl of Wessex; the Mildmay Sports Centre, and the Tindal Building, in 2005; the William Harvey Building in 2007; The Faculty Building (renamed The Marconi Building in 2011) in 2008; and the Postgraduate Medical Institute building – named as Michael Salmon Building in 2017 -, opened 2011. In May 2017, the work has started on the building of Essex's first School of Medicine. The School of Medicine was opened in 2019 by HRH Prince Edward, Duke of Kent.

London 
ARU London has two locations. Farringdon Building is in Charterhouse Street in Holborn, which is on the border of City of London. East India Building is located in former East India Docks and next to Canary Wharf in London Borough of Tower Hamlets.

Peterborough 
Anglia Ruskin University Peterborough was opened in 2022. The University House was the first building at ARU Peterborough. Peterborough Research & Innovation Centre is set to open in 2023.

Student Housing 
The Cambridge, Chelmsford, and Peterborough campuses have accommodation for students to live in during term-time.

Organisation and administration

There are four Faculties of study at Anglia Ruskin University:
 Faculty of Business and Law
 Faculty of Arts, Humanities & Social Sciences
 Faculty of Health, Education, Medicine & Social Care
 Faculty of Science & Engineering

Faculties and Schools

Faculty of Business and Law
The Faculty of Business and Law is located in Cambridge, Chelmsford, Peterborough, and London.

The faculty has two schools, the School of Economics, Finance and Law, and the School of Management.

Anglia Ruskin University is one of the largest business schools in the East of England, with nearly 100 full-time teaching staff and approximately 7,200 students from over 100 countries.

The business school is a member of the EFMD and offers degrees. Several programmes of the business school are accredited by ACCA and CIMA, and many other professional bodies in the United Kingdom.

In 2017, Bloomberg Financial Markets Lab was opened for finance, banking, accounting, and economics students at Chelmsford campus.

The business school was previously called Lord Ashcroft International Business School. It was named after former student at Mid-Essex Technical College, a predecessor institution that is now part of ARU, and former Chancellor of ARU (2001 until 2021) Lord Ashcroft. In January 2020 Lord Ashcroft stepped down after nearly 20 years as Chancellor of Anglia Ruskin University, with Lord Ribeiro appointed as his successor.

During his time as Chancellor, Lord Ashcroft made donations totalling £10 million to build two Lord Ashcroft International Business School facilities in Chelmsford and Cambridge. Lord Ashcroft Building in Chelmsford was inaugurated by Prince Edward, Earl of Wessex in 2003. Lord Ashcroft Building in Cambridge was opened in 2011.

In 2022, the Faculty of Business and Law was awarded the Small Business Charter Award.

Faculty of Science & Technology

The Faculty of Science & Technology was one of the largest faculties at Anglia Ruskin University, with six departments spread across both Cambridge and Chelmsford campuses.

The Department of Built Environment was a large multidisciplinary department with the most comprehensive Built Environment portfolio in Eastern England and is based at the Chelmsford campus.

The Department of Computing and Technology was located at both the Chelmsford and Cambridge campuses. The department maintained close links with the electronics, software, automotive and creative industries, and is a Cisco Systems Regional Networking Academy.

The Department of Life Sciences was located at the Cambridge campus. State-of-the art industry-standard equipment for teaching includes well-equipped laboratories, gas and liquid chromatographic systems, and facilities for drugs analysis, toxicology, fire investigation and DNA analysis.

The Department of Psychology was based at the Cambridge campus. It was recognised for its performance in the 2008 UK Research Assessment Exercise, making it the UK's top-rated Psychology department in a post-1992 university for the quality of its research.

The Department of Vision & Hearing Scienceswas based at the Cambridge Campus for Optometry and Ophthalmic Dispensing

Research: Psychology, Vision, and Environmental Sciences research was rated as "world leading" or of "international" quality in the 2008 UK Research Assessment Exercise. Successes include discoveries of new animal species, design of new car bonnets for improved pedestrian safety, and leading study in the first to study the toxic effects of benzylpiperazine (BZP).

Faculty of Arts, Law & Social Sciences
The Faculty of Arts, Law & Social Sciences (ALSS) offered courses from Foundation to PhD level through its five departments, which include the Cambridge School of Art itself.

The faculty also housed the Anglia Ruskin University Language Centre, which provided language training and courses to students, staff and the general public, and supports 11 research clusters, including the Cultures of the Digital Economy Research Institute (CoDE) Research Institute.

Anglia Law School runs courses on both Cambridge and Chelmsford campuses, with a mock courtroom on each. Course provision includes undergraduate, postgraduate, research and professional qualifications. Their LLB (Hons) Law was rated in the top third of undergraduate law courses in the Guardian League Tables 2013.

Cambridge School of Art is home to some 800 students studying for undergraduate, taught masters and doctoral qualifications. Its graduates include Syd Barrett and David Gilmour of Pink Floyd, Spitting Image Creators Peter Fluck and Roger Law and Creator of St Trinian's Ronald Searle.

English, Communication, Film and Media. The department offered courses at undergraduate, postgraduate and research level over three programmes: Film and Media; English Literature, writing and publishing; and English Language and Intercultural Communication. Their Film and Media provision ranked in the top quarter, and BA (Hons) in the top third, of The Guardian University League Table 2013.

Humanities and Social Sciences. Offered courses in History, Philosophy, Sociology, Public Service and Psychosocial Studies at undergraduate, postgraduate and degree level. Their History and Sociology provision both ranked in the top third of The Guardian University League Table 2013, while Philosophy ranked 16th.

Music and Performing Arts. Offers courses at undergraduate level in Music, Drama, Creative Music Technology, Popular Music and Performing Arts and at postgraduate level in Music Therapy and Dramatherapy. Research Degree supervision is also offered in a range of subjects. The department organises a varied programme of events each semester, including Lunchtime Concerts, Anglia Opera and Festival Week, and provides individual instrumental and vocal tuition.

Anglia Ruskin is a member of the Creative East.

Faculty of Health, Education, Medicine & Social Care

Following a restructure of the university in 2018 the Faculty of Medical Science and the Faculty of Health, Social Care and Education merged to form the new Faculty of Health, Education, Medicine and Social Care. The merger also involved a transition from a department organisation to a school based one. This saw the School of Economics, Finance and Law move to the new Faculty of Business and Law. The University now contains 13 schools.

The Faculty of Health, Social Care & Education was based in Chelmsford, Cambridge, and Peterborough. The Faculty is divided in 5 departments including Acute Care, Allied Health & Medicine, Education, Family & Community Studies and Primary & Public Health.

The Faculty of Health, Social Care & Education offers courses over a range of study levels, from foundation and undergraduate degrees to postgraduate qualifications. A variety of disciplines were available from nursing, operating department practice and social work to midwifery, education studies, public health and laparoscopic surgery.

HSHS, the former Homerton School of Health Studies, was acquired by the University from the Trustees of Homerton College, University of Cambridge, in 2005, after working closely in partnership for a number of years.

The former Faculty of Medical Science built on the international reputation of ARU's Postgraduate Medical Institute (PMI) on its Chelmsford campus, the Faculty of Medical Science (FMS) opened in 2014. The Faculty runs courses at the Department of Allied & Public Health and the Department of Medicine & Healthcare Science. It is home to the university's nascent School of Medicine which is the third department of this Faculty.  The Faculty offers medical and clinically-focussed undergraduate, postgraduate and doctoral level degrees.

It merged with the Faculty of Health, Social Care and Education in 2018 to become the new Faculty of Health, Education, Medicine and Social Care.

On 10 October 2016, Anglia Ruskin announced that they planned to open Essex's first School of Medicine at its Chelmsford Campus. The purpose built brand new medical school would be the first undergraduate medical school in Essex and would cost £20-million to build. The medical school would include state-of-the-art skills facilities, specialist teaching space, a lecture theatre and a cadaveric anatomy suite.

On 19 May 2017, Anglia Ruskin announced that it has begun works to build the purpose built medical school on its Chelmsford Campus, due to be opened in September 2018. Chief Executive of Basildon and Thurrock University Hospitals NHS Foundation Trust, Mid Essex Hospital Services NHS Trust and Southend University Hospital NHS Foundation Trust, Clare Panniker, attended the event alongside other officials.

On 21 September 2017, the university announced that the General Medical Council had approved its curriculum and that the university now had official School of Medicine status.
In 2019 the School was formally opened by Prince Edward, Duke of Kent.

Research Institutes 
Anglia Ruskin has six research institutes.
 Cambridge Institute for Music Therapy Research
 Global Sustainability Institute
 Policing Institute for the Eastern Region
 StoryLab Research Institute
 Veterans and Families Research Institute
 Vision and Eye Research Institute (formerly Vision and Eye Research Unit, VERU

Partnerships 
National partners are School of Osteopathy in London, Cambridge Regional College, Cambridge Theological Federation, College of West Anglia, Renew Counselling in Chelmsford, and University Centre Peterborough.

Distance learning partners are CNET Training and Cambridge Spark.

International partners are Imperium International College, First City University College, andS MAHSA University in Kuala Lumpur in Malaysia, and School of Accounting and Management in St Augustine, Trinidad and Tobago.

Anglia Ruskin University's past and present working life partners are NHS, British Armed Forces, Cambridge University Press, Essex County Council, UPS, Barclays, Capita, Russian Railways, Willmott Dixon, Morgan Sindall Infrastructure, Softwerx, Triangular Alliance, Virgin Money, Timberland, Volvo, and Harrods.

Chelmsford Campus move 
The Chelmsford Central campus closed at the end of the 2007/8 academic year, with all facilities moving to the new buildings at the Rivermead campus (now called the Chelmsford Campus) on Bishop Hall Lane.

Three buildings were saved – the East building (built 1931), the Frederick Chancellor building (built 1902), and the Grade-2-listed Anne Knight building (built in the mid-19th century), which was used by Quakers. The East and Frederick Chancellor buildings fall under a conservation area, meaning they cannot be demolished without planning permission, as they are historically important due to their uses in the early days of higher education in Essex. The site is currently vacant due to the recession halting development which had been planned for many years; however, new plans have been released by Genesis Housing, who currently own the site.

The Chelmsford Campus facilities include a mock law court, mock hospital wards and operating theatres and labs.

ARU Peterborough
On 14 July 2020 the Minister of State for Universities Michelle Donelan announced Anglia Ruskin University (ARU) as the official higher education partner for a new employment-focused university in Peterborough, an initiative by the Cambridgeshire and Peterborough Combined Authority (CPCA) in collaboration with Peterborough City Council (PCC). The campus will also include a materials and manufacturing research and development centre inhabited by 3D printing specialists Photocentric, who have teamed up with the Cambridgeshire and Peterborough Combined Authority to create the facility on the new Peterborough university campus.

Ruskin Gallery
The Ruskin Gallery is the university's public art gallery. Admission is free. Exhibits have included historic and contemporary art, as well as works by students and staff. The gallery is surrounded by fine art, illustration, design, and media studios. On 9 May 2011 Ruskin Gallery unveiled its new digital gallery, which displays art in a digital format on High Definition screens, including the world's first Panasonic 103" 3D Full HD plasma screen.

Arise Innovation Hubs 
Anglia Ruskin University founded Arise Innovations Hubs, which are located in Chelmsford and Harlow. Essex-based innovation hubs promote entrepreneurship and innovations by supporting startups and scaleups.

Anglia Ruskin Enterprise Academy (AREA) 
Anglia Ruskin Enterprise Academy supports entrepreneurship among university students and alumni. AREA organises annually #ThinkBigARU business plan competition for students and alumni. The Entrepreneurs' Community connects students with alumni and external entrepreneurs.

Academic profile

Research 
The 12 subject areas within Anglia Ruskin classified by the Research Excellence Framework (REF) 2014 as producing "world-leading" research are: Allied Health Professions, Dentistry, Nursing and Pharmacy; Architecture, Built Environment and Planning; Art and Design: History, Practice and Theory; Business and Management Studies; Communication, Cultural and Media Studies, Library and Information Management; English Language and Literature; Geography, Environmental Studies and Archaeology; History; Law; Music, Drama, Dance and Performing Arts; Psychology, Psychiatry and Neuroscience and Social Work and Social Policy.

An investigation performed at the end of 2007 by the QAA reveal that as a result of its investigations, the audit team's view of Anglia Ruskin University is that "confidence can reasonably be placed in the soundness of the institution's present and likely future management of the academic standards of the awards that it offers and the quality of the learning opportunities available to students". However, an external inspection of Initial Teacher Education revealed inadequacies in 2010. The areas highlighted were the effectiveness of the provision in securing high quality outcomes for trainees, and the extent to which the training and assessment ensures that all trainees progress to fulfill their potential given their ability and starting points. It was only the Primary ITE that was found to be inadequate in the inspection, the Secondary and FE ITE were awarded a mark of satisfactory. Since this inspection, the Primary ITE has been awarded 'satisfactory' grades by Ofsted in May 2011 and 'good' in 2012.

Rankings 

Anglia Ruskin University was awarded a First in the Green League 2012 by People & Planet. The league is based on ten environmental criteria, both policy and performance related. It incorporates data obtained through the Freedom of Information Act, including the percentage of waste recycled and CO2 emissions for each individual institution.

Anglia Ruskin University has been named as one of the most upwardly mobile universities in the world.

The list, produced by Higher Education strategy consultants Firetail and published by Times Higher Education, includes Anglia Ruskin as one of the 20 "rising stars" in global Higher Education. Anglia Ruskin is the only UK university to feature in the top 20. Nine of the "rising stars" are located in the United States, with universities in Australia, South Korea, Japan, Germany, and Finland completing the list.

Anglia Ruskin University (ARU) is ranked within the top 350 universities in the world and ranked joint 38th in the UK by the Times Higher Education World University Rankings 2020.

In 2021, Anglia Ruskin University (ARU) was in the top 10% of English higher education institutions (HEIs) for skills, enterprise and entrepreneurship and in the top 20% for local growth and regeneration, according to a report by Research England.

Anglia Ruskin was awarded Entrepreneurial University of the Year in the 2014 Times Higher Education Awards. The university won the Duke of York Award for University Entrepreneurship at the Lloyds Bank National Business Awards 2016. In 2021, Anglia Ruskin was awarded The Queen's Anniversary Prize for music therapy research.

History

Anglia Ruskin University has its origins in the Cambridge School of Art, founded by William John Beamont in 1858. The inaugural address was given by John Ruskin (often incorrectly described as the founder; in fact he founded the Ruskin School of Drawing in Oxford). The original location was near Sidney Sussex College, later moving to its present location in East Road, Cambridge. The governing body in the 1920s included two remarkable pioneers in the civic history of Cambridge, Clara Rackham and Lilian Mellish Clarke after whom buildings on the East Road campus were later named. In 1960 this became the Cambridgeshire College of Arts and Technology (CCAT) In 1989 CCAT merged with the Essex Institute of Higher Education, which was originally a vocational school named Chelmsford School of Science and Art and was later known as Mid Essex Technical College and Chelmer Institute of Higher Education, to form the Anglia Higher Education College. The merged college became a polytechnic in 1991, using the name Anglia Polytechnic, and was then awarded university status in 1992.

Initially Anglia Polytechnic University (APU), it retained the word 'polytechnic' in its title because "the term 'polytechnic' still had value to students and their potential employers, symbolising as it did the sort of education that they were known for – equipping students with effective practical skills for the world of work" although in 2000 there was some self-doubt about including the term 'polytechnic' – it was the only university in the country to have done so. Wanting to keep the 'APU' abbreviation, a suggestion put forward by the governors was 'Anglia Prior University' (after a former Chancellor), but the Governors decided to keep 'polytechnic' in the title.

The university eventually reconsidered a name change and chose Anglia Ruskin University (thus incorporating into the title the surname of John Ruskin, who gave the inaugural address of the Cambridge School of Art), with the new name taking effect following the approval of the Privy Council on 29 September 2005.

Former students included the Victorian poet, Augusta Webster, who signed John Stuart Mill's petition for votes of women in 1866. Past lecturers include Odile Crick, wife of Francis Crick, who created the simple iconic image of DNA.
The musician Syd Barrett, songwriter and leading guitarist of the band, Pink Floyd is an alumnus. Author Tom Sharpe was a lecturer in history at CCAT between 1963 and 1972 and Anne Campbell, the Labour MP for Cambridge from 1992 to 2005, was formerly a lecturer in Statistics at CCAT. A blue plaque  to the leading educationalist, Dame Leah Manning, MP was erected  in 2019 at the former ragged school in Young Street acquired by the university in 2006 and subsequently  converted into the Anglia Ruskin University Institute of Music Therapy.

Controversies

Complaints and appeals vs. protests about examination and assignment marking 
In a BBC News article from 3 June 2014, Anglia Ruskin University was reported to have received more complaints and appeals from its students than any of the other 120 universities who responded to freedom of information requests. In the year 2012/13 it received 992 "complaints and appeals". In response, Lesley Dobree, Deputy Vice Chancellor (Academic), said that only 9 of the 992 recorded complaints were actual complaints – the others were protests about examination and assignment marking. It is not known if the BBC responded to this, or if the other universities in the list were assessed by the same criteria.

The article further stated the case of a group of students from the Chelmsford campus, who were abruptly informed that their Legal Practice Course was moved 45 miles to the Cambridge campus. They would therefore be limited to only two days of face-to-face teaching, having to watch the remaining lectures online rather than attend them live.

The Pok Wong Case 
In 2019, Hongkonger Pok Wong, a 2014 graduate of Anglia Ruskin University, received a £61,000 out-of-court settlement from the university after suing it for false advertising, alleging a low quality of teaching. The university has maintained that the payout does not prove that the university was at fault. In 2018, the London County Court ruled in the university’s favour and ordered Wong to pay £13,700 of Anglia Ruskin’s legal costs. However, the university’s insurers then wrote to the former student and offered to settle her £15,000 claim and cover her legal costs. Anglia Ruskin added that it did not support the decision made by its insurer’s solicitors.

Retracting Junius Ho's Honorary Award 
Anglia Ruskin bestowed Junius Ho, a pro-Beijing lawmaker in Hong Kong, with an Honorary Doctor of Laws in 2011. During the 2019–20 Hong Kong protests, Ho was accused of supporting the people who committed the 2019 Yuen Long attack. In response to the controversial speech by Ho, David Alton wrote to the university regarding the matter. Lord Alton urged the University to retract Ho's honorary doctoral degree. It was confirmed by the university that Ho was deprived of his degree on 29 October 2019.

Notable alumni

 Michael Ashcroft, Baron Ashcroft, English investor, billionaire and former Conservative vice chairman
 Lon Kirkop, Maltese visual artist, award winning published author, songwriter and theatre practitioner
 Eddie Ballard, former English cricketer for Cambridge UCCE and Hertfordshire
 Syd Barrett and David Gilmour, Pink Floyd members
 Chris Beckett, academic, author and science-fiction novelist
 Manish Bhasin, sports journalist and BBC presenter
 Henry Brock, specialist linguist at University of Cambridge and illustrator
 Pips Bunce, banking executive and LGBTQ activist
 John Burnside, academic and T. S. Eliot Prize winning author
 Elsie Vera Cole, artist
 Nick Crane, English geographer and TV presenter
 Sarah-Jane Crawford, TV presenter, radio presenter, and model
 Geraldine Finlayson, researcher and director of John Mackintosh Hall
 Peter Fluck and Roger Law, creators of Spitting Image
 Angela Hartnett, entrepreneur and chef
 Kim Howells, Labour politician and former Chair of the Intelligence and Security Committee
 Patrick Le Quément, automobile engineer and former chief designer at Renault
 Ricardo P. Lloyd, British actor
 Devant Maharaj, former Senator and Minister of Food Production, Trinidad and Tobago
 Ian Miller, English footballer
 Magdalene Odundo, a ceramic artist graduate and 2022 Honorary Doctorate of Arts. 
 Tony Palladino, English cricketer
 Anders Holch Povlsen, owner and CEO of Bestseller 
 Shoo Rayner, author and illustrator
 Philip Reeve, author and illustrator of children's books
 Nicky Richards, CEO and Chief Investment Officer MLC Asset Management
 Andrew Sayer, English economist, professor of Social Theory and Political Economy at Lancaster University
 Patricia Scotland, Baroness Scotland of Asthal, Labour politician, Commonwealth Secretary-General, government policy-maker, former minister, attorney general and president of Chatham House
 Ronald Searle, creator of St Trinian's
 Michal Shalev, author and illustrator of children's books
 Tim Stokely, CEO of OnlyFans
 Mark Wood, businessman, accountant and chairman of NSPCC
 Barbara Yung, Hong Kong actress
 Sarah Perry FRSL, author
 Emilia Monjowa Lifaka, Chairperson of the Commonwealth Parliamentary Association
 Ama Pomaa Boateng MP

Honorary Doctors 

 Kylie Minogue OBE
 Stephen Fry
 Griff Rhys Jones
 Anya Hindmarch CBE
 Katie Piper
 Germaine Greer
 Anders Holch Povlsen
 Lord Anthony Giddens GCIH
 Lord Bernard Ribeiro CBE
 David Gilmour CBE
 Hermann Hauser KBE
 Mark Foster
 Lord Michael Ashcroft KCMG PC
 Suzi Quatro
 Anne Campbell MP
 Andrew Sentance CBE
 Barbara Young, Baroness Young of Old Scone
 Richard Dannatt GCB
 David Prior, Baron Prior of Brampton
 Robert Dixon-Smith, Baron Dixon-Smith
 Wilko Johnson
 Baroness Dido Harding

See also 
 Armorial of UK universities
 Cambridge Theological Federation
 List of universities in the United Kingdom

Notes

External links

 
1992 establishments in England
Educational institutions established in 1992
Universities established in the 1990s
Universities UK
University Alliance